Marcela Nicole Santos Romero (born 24 January 2000) is a Honduran footballer who plays as a midfielder for the Honduras women's national team.

International career
Santos capped for Honduras at senior level during the 2020 CONCACAF Women's Olympic Qualifying Championship qualification.

References

2000 births
Living people
Honduran women's footballers
Women's association football midfielders
Honduras women's international footballers